Soccer Night in America (also known as MLS Saturday/MLS on Fox Soccer) was a weekly presentation of Major League Soccer games on FOX Soccer that began in 2003. From 2005 to 2011, FOX Soccer showed 25 to 30 live games each season, plus 2 to 3 playoff games. In 2007, MLS Saturday started showing a 30-minute pregame and a 30-minute postgame show for each game.

In 2011, MLS on Fox Soccer was rebranded as Soccer Night in America, with its production revamped to provide a viewing experience similar to NFL on Fox. However, Fox was outbid by NBC Sports Network for its MLS package for the 2012–2014 seasons.

In 2015, Soccer Night in America was again rebranded as MLS Soccer Sunday due to a new deal between Fox and ESPN, with games on Fox Sports 1 airing from 7-9pm ET.

See also
MLS Primetime Thursday
MLS Game of the Week
MLS Soccer Sunday

References

Major League Soccer on television
2003 American television series debuts
2011 American television series endings
Fox Soccer original programming